Mary Susan Gast (born 1945 in Benton Harbor, Michigan) is the eighth Poet laureate of Benicia, California. She is a graduate of Michigan State University and Chicago Theological Seminary.  She edits a poetry column for the Benicia Herald entitled "Going the Distance."

Works

Books
That We May All (Finally!) be One : Covenant, Hospitality, and the Expanding Identity of the United Church of Christ The Pilgrim Press. 2016.

Anthologies (Editor)
 Yearning to Breathe Free: A Community Journal of 2020 Benicia Literary Arts. 2020.

Anthologies (Contributor)
 Light and Shadow Benicia Literary Arts. 2018. 
 Sign of the Times Benicia Literary Arts. 2012.

See also 

 List of municipal poets laureate in California

References

Municipal Poets Laureate in the United States
Poets from California
People from Benicia, California
1945 births
21st-century American poets
Living people